Kratke Range is a mountain range in Eastern Highlands, Papua New Guinea.  Several rivers, including Aziana, Yaiga, Lamari and Ramu  originate in the mountains. Many endemic birds live in the mountains.

History 
In November 1889 Hugo Zöller became the first European to enter the Kratke Range from the former German colony Kaiser-Wilhelmsland in German New Guinea during an expedition to the Finisterre Range.  He then called it the Krätkegebirge, after the governor of German colony,  (1845-1934).
Kratke Range  was only explored after the German colonial era at the beginning of the 1920s.

Geography 
Kratke Range runs south of the Finisterre mountains on the other side of the river Markham and joins the Bismarck Range to the east. 
One of the peaks  was called Zöllerberg after Hugo Zöller.  The highest peak is the Mount Tabletop with 3.686 m height.
The mountains are of volcanic origin and overgrown by tropical mountain rainforest.  Above 3,000 m, alpine grasslands predominate.  In the mountains live various endemic bird species, including for example the Modest tiger parrot.

See also
Kratke Range languages

References 

Mountain ranges of Papua New Guinea